Love's Crazy is the solo debut album of 112 member Slim. It was released on November 18, 2008. The first single from the album is "So Fly", featuring Yung Joc. The second single is "Good Lovin'", featuring Ryan Leslie and Fabolous. The third single is scheduled to be the remix to "Heels On" featuring Yung Berg and Deezo.

Track listing

Charts

Weekly charts

Year-end charts

References

2008 debut albums
Albums produced by Ryan Leslie